Retrocession Day is the name given to the annual observance and a former public holiday in Taiwan to commemorate the end of Japanese rule of Taiwan and Penghu, and the claimed retrocession ("return") of Taiwan to the Republic of China on 25 October 1945. However, the idea of "Taiwan retrocession" is in dispute.

Historical background

Taiwan, then more commonly known to the Western world as "Formosa", became a colony of the Empire of Japan when the Qing Empire lost the First Sino-Japanese War in 1894 and ceded the island with the signing of the 1895 Treaty of Shimonoseki. Japanese rule in Taiwan lasted until the end of World War II.

In November 1943, Chiang Kai-shek took part in the Cairo Conference with Franklin D. Roosevelt and Winston Churchill, who firmly advocated that Japan be required to return all of the territory it had annexed into its empire, including Taiwan and the Penghu (Pescadores) Islands. Article 8 of the Potsdam Declaration, drafted by the United States, United Kingdom, and China in July 1945, reiterated that the provisions of the Cairo Declaration be thoroughly carried out, and the Japanese Instrument of Surrender stated Japan's agreement to the terms of the Potsdam Proclamation.

Under the authorization of American General Douglas MacArthur's General Order No. 1, Chen Yi (Chief Executive of Taiwan Province) was escorted by George H. Kerr to Taiwan to accept the Japanese government's surrender as the Chinese delegate. When the Japanese surrendered at the end of World War II, General Rikichi Andō, governor-general of Taiwan and commander-in-chief of all Japanese forces on the island, signed an instrument of surrender and handed it over to Governor-General of Taiwan Chen Yi, representing the Republic of China Armed Forces to complete the official turnover in Taipei (known during occupation as Taihoku) on 25 October 1945, at Taipei City Hall (now Zhongshan Hall). Chen Yi proclaimed that day to be "Retrocession Day" and organized the island into the Taiwan Province of the Republic of China. Taiwan has since been governed by the Government of the Republic of China.

Controversy
 Taiwanese historian  claims the following: After World War II ended, officials of the Republic of China traveled to Taiwan to accept the surrender of Japanese forces on behalf of the Allies. Although they claimed that it was "Taiwan Retrocession", it was actually a provisional military occupation and was not a transfer of territories of Taiwan and Penghu. A transfer of territory requires a conclusion of an international treaty in order to be valid. But before the government of the Republic of China was able to conclude a treaty with Japan, it was overthrown by the Chinese Communist party and fled its territory. Consequently, that contributed to the controversy of the "Undetermined Status of Taiwan" and the controversy over "Taiwan Retrocession".
 The official position of both the People's Republic of China and the Republic of China is that Taiwan and Penghu were returned to the Republic of China according to the terms of the 1945 Japanese Instrument of Surrender, which stipulated Japan's compliance with the terms of the Potsdam Declaration. The Potsdam Declaration in turn included the terms of the Cairo Declaration, which required Japan to return all conquered territories to China, including Taiwan and the Pescadores.
 The Democratic Progressive Party, which rejects the idea of Taiwan being taken back by China, downplayed the event during their two presidencies.
 Because the Republic of China officials who accepted the surrenders of Japanese Forces in 1945 were all representatives of the Allies of World War II, there are opinions that Japanese Forces on Taiwan actually surrendered to the Allies, not to the Republic of China, and therefore the so-called "Taiwan Retrocession Day" is merely "Surrenders of Japanese Forces to the Allies Day", which marked the beginning of military occupation and was not a retrocession. The opinions further believe that "Taiwan Retrocession" is a misleading term.
 Writing in the American Journal of International Law in July 2000, Jonathan I. Charney and J. R. V. Prescott maintained that the Chinese Nationalists (ROC) began a military occupation of Taiwan in 1945 as a result of Japan's surrender, and that none of the post-World War II peace treaties explicitly ceded sovereignty over Formosa and the Pescadores to any specific state or government.
 As late as November 1950, the United States State Department announced that no formal act restoring sovereignty over Formosa and the Pescadores to China had yet occurred; British officials reiterated this viewpoint in 1955, saying that "The Chinese Nationalists began a military occupation of Formosa and the Pescadores in 1945. However, these areas were under Japanese sovereignty until 1952."

Taiwan independence viewpoint
Supporters of Taiwan independence have argued that Taiwanese retrocession was invalid since there is no precedent in international law in which an instrument of surrender effected a transfer of sovereignty, and they base their belief in part on both a declassified CIA report from March 1949 confirming that Taiwan was not a part of the Republic of China and President Truman's 27 June 1950, statement regarding Taiwan's "undetermined status", which they hold as proof of the leading Allies' views. In a lengthy legal essay published in Tokyo in 1972, Chairman Ng Chiau-tong, World United Formosans for Independence, analyzed the British Parliamentary records and other documents before concluding that the legal status of Taiwan was undetermined.

See also
 Holidays in Taiwan
 Victory over Japan Day
 Political status of Taiwan
 Zhongshan Hall
 Theory of the Undetermined Status of Taiwan

References

External links

 Taiwan's Retrocession Day on the Government Information Office website of Taiwan

October observances
Taiwan under Japanese rule
Taiwan under Republic of China rule
1945 in Taiwan
1945 in China